Khalifa Abdullah (Arabic:خليفة عبد الله) (born 20 February 1991) is an Emirati footballer plays for Al-Arabi .

External links

References

Emirati footballers
1991 births
Living people
Al-Wasl F.C. players
Al Shabab Al Arabi Club Dubai players
Ajman Club players
Al-Arabi SC (UAE) players
UAE Pro League players
UAE First Division League players
Association football midfielders